The Sydney Telstra 500 was the fourteenth and final event of the 2009 V8 Supercar Championship Series and the inaugural running of the Sydney 500. It was held on the weekend of the December 4 to 6 on the roads running through the former Olympic precinct at Sydney Olympic Park, Sydney, New South Wales.

The Sydney Telstra 500 consisted of the 25th and 26th races of the season. The race format followed the same as the Adelaide 500, with a 250 kilometre race each day.

The first race was won by Holden Racing Team's Garth Tander from pole position while, the second 250 km race was won by Dick Johnson Racing's James Courtney (who started from second position on the grid). Jamie Whincup secured the 2009 V8 Supercar Championship Series after finishing fifth in Race 25 and fourteenth in Race 26. 

This event also marked the final race for Cameron McConville, who has now retired from full-time V8 Supercar racing. The Sydney 500 was the end of Triple Eight Race Engineering's association with Ford before shifting to Holden in 2010.

Results
Results as follows:

Race 25

Qualifying

Top Ten Shootout

Race 
Garth Tander led early with Lee Holdsworth in pursuit. Buried in the grid, Craig Lowndes was the first to pit when the pit window opened. David Reynolds damaged his car in the early running. On lap 10 Michael Patrizi crashed into the wall with no brakes, bringing out the safety car. Tander lost the lead in the pits, then as Holdsworth pulled away, Whincup took second from Tander as well. Fighting over fourth position, Cameron McConville and Greg Murphy made contact in pitlane, as Murphy was released from his pitbay into McConville's path. Murphy was later black flagged for the incident. Both Holden Racing Team Commodores were slowing, affecting Will Davison's chances of keeping the championship alive, and affecting Tander's ability to match pace with Holdsworth and Whincup.

Lap 24 saw Alex Davison pitting with suspension damage after having clouted the wall earlier in the race. Lap 26 saw Paul Dumbrell dive up the inside of Jack Perkins and made contact with Dean Fiore in front of Perkins sending both cars into a spin. The two cars cleared the chicane with Fiore stopping soon afterwards and Dumbrell exiting on the inside of the chicane. Immediately afterwards race leader Lee Holdsworth slid into the wall on the outside of the middle part of the chicane having found no traction after hitting a portion of the track compromised by fluid dropped by Fiore. At the safety car restart Whincup overshot a corner, allowing Tander back into the race lead.

On lap 39 Will Davison made a big dive up the inside of Craig Lowndes at the first turn but dived in too deep with a locked tyre and hit Lowndes, deranging Lowndes steering. Davison continued with a bent steering arm while Lowndes had more severe damage. Davison was later given a black flag penalty. Lap 43 Cameron McConville hit the wall having freshly stopped for tyres damaging the front right corner of the car. Shane van Gisbergen briefly nosed into the wall behind McConville. Lap 47 saw Russell Ingall dive into a wall. Murphy received contact from Jack Perkins, spinning Murphy's car into a tyre barrier. James Courtney received a mechanical black flag as his right side front door started flapping open. Courtney was forced to pit to address the flapping door. The problem was not fixed correctly and Courtney was forced to make a second stop. Steven Johnson hit the wall on lap 57 with Jack Perkins also making contact two laps later.

Race 26

Qualifying

Race 
Holdsworth led away from pole position, only to lose it to James Courtney on the second lap. Rick Kelly also passed Holdsworth. Winterbottom slotted into fourth ahead of Jason Bright and Michael Caruso. Steven Richards was first to pit with damage after contact with Shane van Gisbergen sent Richards into the wall, damaging the right side of the car. Rick Kelly briefly brushed the wall exiting turn 8 and lost four race positions, dropping behind Holdsworth, Winterbottom, Bright and Greg Murphy.

Lap 14 saw Rick Kelly hit turn eight even harder, this time deranging the front right corner of the car, effectively putting him out of the race. Two laps later, Todd Kelly, having just made his first pit-stop, under-steered into the same barrier as his brother, with much lighter damage. Lap 21 saw Mark Winterbottom have an off and drop to 18th place. Holdsworth stayed out on a long stint. The stint came to an end when Holdsworth understeered off at turn 8, damaging the front right corner and cutting a brake line. Michael Patrizi crashed lightly into the same barrier and continued. Holdsworth was unable to make it back to the pits and a safety car was called for although Holdsworth pulled up off the course.

At the restart Greg Murphy understeered off the track at the first turn in a self-inflicted mistake, backing the car into the wall and popping out the rear windscreen, handing second position to the charging Craig Lowndes. Whincup pitted at the end of lap 37 then on his outlap Whincup nosed into the wall at turn 8. Jason Bargwanna also hit the wall but continued. Most of the front runners pitted immediately, with Craig Lowndes striking Alex Davison leaving pitlane, subsequently leaving pitlane. Courtney missed the pitstop and had to pit the following lap but retained the race lead.

At the restart, Jason Bright leapt out of turn 8 to blast past James Courtney to take the lead. Bright also received a drive through penalty as well, again for contact in the pitlane, an 'unsafe release'. That handed the lead back to James Courtney with Michael Caruso pressing hard. An accident for Mark McNally triggered the fourth safety car period, with the race restarting on lap 54 with Courtney leading Caruso, Winterbottom, Ingall and Fabian Coulthard. Cameron McConville, Jason Bright and Craig Lowndes (sucked into Bright's accident) all brushed walls on the restart lap. Lowndes and McConville retired. Todd Kelly began dropping down field with battery or alternator problems.

Lap 60 saw Winterbottom brush the wall exiting the rapidly infamous turn 8, peeling off the door skin on the right side of the car. Winterbottom kept in third place, tucked into a six car train, ending in a position battled between Shane van Gisbergen and Greg Murphy.

Standings
 After Race 26 of 26

Support categories

References

External links
 Official series website
 Official timing and results

Sydney 500
Motorsport in Sydney
December 2009 sports events in Australia